KGBB (103.9 FM, "Bob FM") is a commercial radio station that is licensed to Edwards, California and serves the Antelope Valley area. The station is owned by Adelman Broadcasting, Inc. and broadcasts an adult hits format under the "Bob FM" moniker.

History
The station first signed on in March 1990 as KRAJ, originally licensed to Johannesburg, California. Owned by Robert Adelman from its launch, KRAJ aired a hot adult contemporary (hot AC) format as "103.9 The Zone" in 1991.

In 1999, the station flipped to a regional Mexican format as "Radio Exitos" with new call letters KEDD. KRAJ's call sign and hot AC format moved to a new signal on 100.9 FM.

In 2006, the transmitter was moved from El Paso Peak to a new location adjacent to that of KTPI-FM. The format changed to adult hits as "Bob FM" shortly thereafter, and the call letters were changed to KGBB.

References

External links

GBB
Adult hits radio stations in the United States
Bob FM stations